Oscar Carruth McGehee (cited as O. Carruth McGehee, born 29 November 1939 in Baton Rouge) is an American mathematician, specializing in commutative harmonic analysis, functional analysis, and complex analysis.

Education and career
After graduation from Baton Rouge High School, McGehee matriculated at Rice University, where he received his B.A. in 1961. He became a graduate student at Yale University, where he graduated with M.A. in 1963 and Ph.D. in 1966. His doctoral dissertation was Two Problems of Fourier Analysis on Thin Sets, supervised by Yitzhak Katznelson.

At the University of California, Berkeley, McGehee was an instructor from 1965 to 1967 and an assistant professor from 1967 to 1971. At Louisiana State University (LSU) he was an associate professor from 1971 to 1979 and a full professor from 1979 to 2005, when he retired as professor emeritus. At LSU he was chair of the mathematics department from 1979 to 1984 and dean of the division of academic services from 1986 to 1990.

In 1967–1968 he was a NATO Postdoctoral Fellow at the Faculté des Science d'Orsay, France. He was a visiting professor in autumn 1977 at the University of Illinois at Champaign-Urbana and in spring 1978 at the University of Oregon. In 1984 he was elected a Fellow of the American Association for the Advancement of Science.

Selected publications

Articles
 
 
 
  
 
 with Yitzhak Katznelson: 
 with Louis Pigno and Brent Smith:

Books
 with Colin C. Graham:  2012 pbk reprint

References

External links
 

1939 births
Living people
20th-century American mathematicians
21st-century American mathematicians
Fellows of the American Association for the Advancement of Science
Baton Rouge Magnet High School alumni
Rice University alumni
Yale University alumni
University of California, Berkeley faculty
Louisiana State University faculty